Willie Hunter is a former American football player and coach. He served as the head football coach at Clark Atlanta University from 1990 to 1996.

Hunter played college football at Fort Valley State College and also played professionally for the Atlanta Spartans of the Atlantic Coast Football League in 1964. After teaching and coaching football in the Atlanta Public Schools system for 33 years, he resigned in 1989 and was hired as the defensive coordinator at Clark Altana. In January 1990, Hunter succeeded William M. Spencer as head coach after Spencer was fired.

Head coaching record

College

References

Year of birth missing (living people)
Living people
American football defensive backs
Atlantic Coast Football League players
Clark Atlanta Panthers football coaches
Fort Valley State Wildcats football players
Georgia Tech Yellow Jackets football coaches
High school football coaches in Georgia (U.S. state)
Schoolteachers from Georgia (U.S. state)
African-American schoolteachers
African-American coaches of American football
African-American players of American football
20th-century African-American educators
20th-century African-American sportspeople